Invasion Live is a live album by the English rock band Magnum. It was released in 1989 by Receiver Records. All tracks were recorded at the Municipal Auditorium in Nashville, Tennessee, on 29 April 1982, whilst supporting Ozzy Osbourne.

Most of the material released here was used as bonus tracks for Magnum's expanded and remastered series on Sanctuary Records.

Track listing

Personnel
Tony Clarkin — guitar
Bob Catley — vocals
Wally Lowe — bass guitar
Mark Stanway — keyboards
Kex Gorin — drums

References

External links
 www.magnumonline.co.uk — Official Magnum site

Magnum (band) live albums
1989 live albums